The 1983 Rivers State gubernatorial election occurred on August 13, 1983. NPN candidate Melford Okilo won the election.

Results
Melford Okilo representing NPN won the election. The election held on August 13, 1983.

References 

Rivers State gubernatorial elections
Rivers State gubernatorial election
Rivers State gubernatorial election